Tanai Township is a township in Myitkyina District of Kachin State, in northern Myanmar. The principal town is Tanai.

Townships of Kachin State